People Like Us was a South-African Hi-NRG band from the mid-1980s who had success with their song "Deliverance".

Early careers 
Producers Paul Crossley and Terry Owen were working with another South African group called Shiraz (band) during the mid-1980s. After the release of their first single, "Fighting For Our Lives", they were told by record executives that they were not willing to push the band further due to the lead singer's heavy South African accent. They were immediately looking for a new voice for their new project People Like Us. Then one night, while visiting the famous Johannesburg night-club Bella Napoli's, they heard the raspy and powerful vocals of Cindy Dickenson performing on stage and they knew they had found exactly what they were looking for. 
They soon recorded several songs in the studio, and released their first single "Midnight Lover" under the watchful eye of music executive Hilton Rosenthal who would later produce albums like 'Graceland' for Paul Simon and who was also the manager for South-African outfit Juluka and Savuka. Another important figure in the creative process was Giuseppe "Peps" Cotummuccio, a musician who was part of the group Syndicate with Cindy Dickenson at that time. Also of importance was co-writer, producer and mixer Bobby Summerfield, who currently has his own music company in LA www.summerfieldmusic.com, Summerfield Music, Inc. "Midnight Lover" received a good response from DJs on the club scene and opened the door for further expansion.

"Deliverance" 
Then in 1987 their song "Deliverance' was released. This would be the song to make them well known in the clubs of Europe and all over the world where Hi-NRG and Euro disco songs were still the favourite music styles pumping out of the speakers. People did not at first know that People Like Us was a South African outfit and expected them to be from the UK due to the record company Passion who distributed their music was based there (The UK) and possibly due to the fear that the record buying public would not purchase anything that came from South Africa because of the country's Apartheid regime. In South Africa the songs was also a favourite in clubs and at house parties but records were only available through import and people only found out that they were South African at the height of "Deliverance"'s popularity. "Deliverance" caused quite a stir under some church leaders in pre-democratic ultra-conservative South Africa due to the song's lyrical content. The debut album was released titled 'Deliverance' and featured further tracks including "Hiroshima" (#28, 1987), "Restless Hearts" and "Reincarnation (Coming Back for Love)". Enquiries about People Like Us came from all over the world and a tour of the UK was launched. Then disaster struck when Paul Crossley fell gravely ill with AIDS at the height of their popularity. Paul Crossley died on 6 August 1989. His death had serious repercussions for People Like Us, as Paul Crossley was seen as the main driving force of the band and this dampened the future progression of the band. Subsequently, People Like Us covered the Shiraz song "Fighting For Our Lives", bringing homage to Crossley. During that period leading up to Crossley's death the situation between Cindy, Terry and Paul soured and Cindy decided not to be involved with future albums. Cindy also fell pregnant with her son Danny and performing and recording would take a back seat for the next couple of years.

"Resurrection" 
During 1988 Terry Owen teamed up with another South African musical mastermind Robin Hogarth for the work on the next album. Hogarth would go on to win two Grammy Awards for his producing work in 2007 and 2008. Angie Gold who was known for her hit "Eat You Up" then became the new voice of People Like Us and recorded songs including "Resurrection" and "Two To Tango". She also recorded the ballad "Prayer For You" which was originally co-written by Cindy Dickenson. The later work of People Like Us could not live up to the original success of "Deliverance" and some might speculate it was because of the untimely death of Paul Crossley or the departure of Cindy Dickenson. Another reason might be the rapid change in dance music during that time especially in Europe from a Hi-NRG and Euro disco driven sound to the more American influenced House music style that would soon conquer the dance music world.

Biography of Cindy Dickenson
Cindy was born in the UK and received professional training from the age of ten as a soprano at The Manchester School of Music under Professor Campbell from BBC Radio.
She worked with various bands all over the UK and also got involved with song writing.
She came to visit her sister in South Africa and enjoyed it so much that she decided to stay. Whilst there she got an agent, which got her signed at RPM Records. She soon released a rock-orientated single "Love Stealer", which had on the B-side one of her own compositions, "You make me fee like a woman". With that song she won a Sarie Award (South African equivalent to the Grammies). 
The group Syndicate, with band member Peps Cotummaccio, approached her to join them and they were soon touring Cape Town for six months and also travelled to Italy, England, Greece, Portugal and Mexico for performances. They released the single "Don't Go into Town".
She also travelled on the passenger cruise ship the QE2 as the singer for the Harry Bence Orchestra for six months, which travelled from the UK to America.
Paul Crossley and Terry Owen then became involved with her on People Like Us and recorded several songs for which she received very little money and nothing was signed officially. Later after the initial success of People Like Us this would become one of the topics that would tore the relationships of the band to an irreconcilable situation.  
After the birth of her son Cindy took a break from the industry and later became involved with other projects including Strutt, with Denise Ostler and Helena Muir. Strutt recently also included a male singer David who came from Cindy's singing school Reach for the Stars Voice Training Academy.23, of which she is the director. 
Cindy Dickenson is currently living in Durban, South Africa where her husband is the radio DJ Dave Guselli on East Coast Radio.

People Like Us albums 
 Deliverance 
(LP & Cassette – 1987)

Side 1
 "Hiroshima"
 "Reincarnation"
 "Fighting for Our Lives"

Side 2
 "Deliverance"
 "Midnight Lover"
 "Restless Hearts"

 People Like Us 
(Compilation CD including some of their old songs plus the new Angie Gold tracks – 1988)

 "Resurrection" – feat Angie Gold
 "Heart in the Night" – feat Angie Gold
 "Deliverance" – feat Cindy Dickenson
 "Fight For You" – feat Angie Gold
 "Hiroshima" – feat Cindy Dickenson
 "Love Will Survive" – feat Cindy Dickenson
 "Two To Tango" – feat Angie Gold
 "Midnight Lover" – feat Cindy Dickenson
 "Prayer For You" – feat Angie Gold

References and links 
 Robin Hogarth's Grammy Awards
 Hilton Rosenthal's Profile
 Hilton Rosenthal's work with Paul Simon
 Bobby Summerfield's Profile
 Angie Gold's Profile

Hi-NRG groups
South African dance musicians